2022 census may refer to:

2022 census of Ireland
2022 Romanian census
2022 Scottish census
2022 South African census